The following is a list of affiliates of TBD, a United States digital broadcast television network owned by Sinclair Broadcast Group that focuses on internet-based series and content targeting millennial audiences.  The network commenced programming on February 13, 2017 with at least two broadcast affiliates, KDSM-TV/Des Moines and WLUK-TV/Green Bay, adding the network to one of their digital subchannels on that date.  The February 13 date was the beginning of a "soft roll-out" of TBD affiliates; by February 24, 49 stations, all owned or operated by Sinclair, are either carrying the network or have been indicated as a future affiliate.  TBD will be added to other Sinclair stations during Spring 2017 before being offered to stations in markets outside of Sinclair's geographic footprint.

Stations listed in BOLD are TBD owned-and-operated.

Current affiliates

Former affiliates

References

External links
TBD.com – Official website

TBD